Vinashak – Destroyer is a 1998 Indian Hindi-language action film directed by Ravi Dewan and starring Sunil Shetty, Raveena Tandon and Danny Denzongpa.

Plot
Police Inspector Arjun Singh is a brave and honest police inspector stationed in Khandala. He is a very strict police officer and uses harsh ways against all the criminals. His colleague and friend is Inspector Khan who always supports him. Arjun is in love with Kaajal who is the daughter of a senior police officer, ACP Amar Agnihotri. Arjun's father does not agree with the harsh ways he uses against the criminals.
Near Mumbai, in the Central Jail, Jailer Lankeshwar uses his jail as a trade center for weapons and narcotics. ACP Amar is suspicious of Lankeshwar's actions. He requests the higher authorities to let Arjun go into the jail and gather evidence about Lankeshwar's evil deeds. The plan is that Arjun will fire a blank bullet on ACP Amar. Arjun pleads guilty in court and is sentenced to jail. In jail Arjun learns that arms, drugs and explosives are smuggled from the jail. He reports it secretly to the Home Minister and the New Police Commissioner through constable Hariram. But the fact is that ACP Amar was really killed inside the ambulance and Arjun is trapped. His sister is gang-raped and father is killed by Lankeswar's goon Azgar.

Inspector Khan learns of Arjun's plight and decides to help him. He sneaks into the jail and breaks Arjun's chains. Arjun destroys the jail's office with the help of Khan. However, Khan is fatally shot by the police. Soon he approaches Kaajal, who is furious with him for killing her father; however, after hearing the whole story, she forgives him and decides to help him.

Arjun plans to take his revenge in a systematic way. He becomes a one-man army and kills many of Lankeshwar's henchmen. Lankeshwar, Home Minister and Police Commissioner are afraid as Arjun has set upon a killing spree. Arjun kills the Police Commissioner, Home Minister and Azgar, the main henchman of jailer. In fright Lankeshwar pleads guilty in court and is sentenced to be a prisoner in his own jail. Arjun sensing his motive also pleads guilty and is imprisoned the same jail. However Lankeshwar, along with his fellow officers, decides to escape and become terrorists. When they escape Arjun starts a killing spree. Lankeshwar and Arjun have a final showdown in the jail. Arjun beats Lankeshwar, then drags Lankeshwar to the gallows and hangs him. The film ends with Arjun clad in a police uniform saluting with Kaajal and the Indian flag in the background.

Cast
Suniel Shetty as Arjun Singh
Raveena Tandon as Kaajal
Danny Denzongpa as Jailer Lankeshwar
Alok Nath as Police Commissioner
Tinnu Anand as Home Minister
Om Puri as Inspector Khan
Mohan Joshi as A.C.P. Amar
Mukesh Rishi as Ajgar, Lankeshwar's  henchman.
Shivaji Satam as Hariram
Satyen Kappu as Arjun's father
Harish Patel as convict

Soundtrack

References

External links

1998 films
1990s Hindi-language films
1990s action films
Films scored by Viju Shah
Indian remakes of American films
Films shot in Jammu and Kashmir
Indian prison films